Marko Virtanen (born December 10, 1968) is a Finnish former professional ice hockey player. He is currently the head coach of Lukko in the Finnish Liiga.

Virtanen assumed the position of head coach for JYP Jyväskylä with the 2013–14 Liiga season. He has also previously coached  TPS Turku.

References

External links

1968 births
Living people
Färjestad BK players
Finnish ice hockey coaches
Finnish ice hockey right wingers
JYP Jyväskylä players
Södertälje SK players
Sportspeople from Jyväskylä